Utada Hikaru Single Collection Vol. 1 is the first compilation album by Hikaru Utada, released on March 31, 2004. It features all A-sides of her hit singles to that date, including 11 number-one hits and all 15 tracks reached the top 5. The album version was remastered by Ted Jensen. The album was released on iTunes in April 2004.

It sold over 1.4 million copies in its debut week, and became the number one selling album of the year in Japan (Her fourth consecutive time accomplishing this particular milestone, a record in Japan's music history.). This is Utada's longest charting release on any Oricon chart, with a 2-year trajectory and still growing. Utada Hikaru Single Collection Vol. 1 is the 35th highest selling album in Japan of all time. The album is Japan's 21st highest-ranked in debut sales. The album was the 19th best selling album worldwide in 2004.

Track listing

Charts

Weekly charts

Monthly charts

Year-end charts

All-time charts

Sales and certifications

References

2004 greatest hits albums
Hikaru Utada albums
Hikaru Utada compilation albums
Japanese-language compilation albums
Universal Music Japan albums